Marun Kalateh (also Romanized as Mārūn Kalāteh; also known as Mārān Kalāteh) is a village in Shirang Rural District, Kamalan District, Aliabad County, Golestan Province, Iran. At the 2006 census, its population was 967, in 211 families.

References 

Populated places in Aliabad County